The Saksenaeaceae are a family of fungi in the order Mucorales. It was circumscribed in 1974 by J.J. Ellis and Clifford Hesseltine.

Description
This family is characterized by having sporangia that are lageniform and columellate. Zygospores  are unknown.

References

External links
 

Fungus families
Zygomycota